is a Japanese photographer.

References

External links 
 

Japanese photographers
1937 births
Living people
Place of birth missing (living people)